Bagheera is the black panther in Rudyard Kiplings The Jungle Book

Bagheera may also refer to:

Archambault Bagheera, a French sailboat design
Bagheera (spider), a spider genus
Bagheera (film), a 2023 Indian Tamil-language film
Bagheera (clothing), a shoe and clothing manufacturer
Matra Bagheera, an automobile
, a US Navy auxiliary schooner serving as a patrol vessel in commission from 1917 to 1919
BAGHEERA (schooner), a historic windjamming schooner based in Portland, Maine
Bagheera (fabric), a type of fine velvet cloth
Bagheera Mountain, a mountain in the Hermit Range of the Selkirk Mountains in the Canadian Rocky Mountains, part of the Glacier National Park (Canada)
Bagheera Blades, a former bandy club, US Champions in 1984 and 1985